Kuala Berang (est. pop. : 18764) is the seat and largest town of Hulu Terengganu District, Terengganu, Malaysia. The town serves as a gateway to Lake Kenyir. The historical Terengganu Inscription Stone was found near Kuala Berang in 1899. The town of Kuala Berang was the first capital of the modern Sultanate of Terengganu before moving to Kuala Terengganu.

Car

Kuala Berang is connected to Ajil and subsequently Kuala Terengganu by Federal Route 106 and then Federal Route 14. Federal Route 247 begins in Kuala Berang and ends at Kuala Jenderis, where it interchanges into Federal Route 185 which goes to Gua Musang in Kelantan, Cameron Highlands in Pahang before terminating at Simpang Pulai near Ipoh in Perak.

Alternately there is an interchange to the East Coast Expressway at Ajil.

Public transport

As with the rest of Terengganu, Kuala Berang does not have any form of rail transport.

Politics

Kuala Berang forms its own electoral district in the Terengganu State Legislative Assembly, currently represented by Yang Berhormat Dr. Haji Mamad Puteh of PAS.

On the national level, Kuala Berang is part of the Hulu Terengganu parliamentary constituency, currently represented by Yang Berhormat Dato' Rosol Wahid, from PPBM.

References 

Hulu Terengganu District
Towns in Terengganu